Troublesome Creek is a stream in Yukon–Koyukuk Census Area, Alaska, in the United States. It is a tributary of Hess Creek.

Troublesome Creek was named by prospectors. The area around the creek was known by the pioneers as "Troublesome country" for its steep and rocky terrain.

See also
List of rivers of Alaska

References

Rivers of Yukon–Koyukuk Census Area, Alaska
Rivers of Alaska
Rivers of Unorganized Borough, Alaska